Syncletica of Alexandria was a Christian saint and Desert Mother from Roman Egypt in the 4th century. She is the subject of the Vita S. Syncleticæ, a Greek hagiography purportedly by Athanasius of Alexandria (d. 373) but not written in fact before 450. She then appears as amma Syncletica, an anchorite to whom are attributed twenty-eight sayings in the Apophthegmata Patrum, compiled c.480–500.

Life 
Syncletica was of a wealthy background and is reputed to have been very beautiful. From childhood, however, Syncletica was drawn to dedicate her life to God.

From the time she took responsibility for her family's affairs, after her parents' deaths, she gave to the poor all that had been left to her. With her younger blind sister, Syncletica abandoned the life of the city and instead resided in a crypt, thus adopting a hermetic lifestyle. Her holy life soon gained the attention of locals and, gradually, many women joined her to live as her disciples in Christ.

Veneration 
Amma Syncletica is regarded as a "Desert Mother" and her sayings are recorded with those of the Desert Fathers. She is believed to have died in her eightieth year, around 350 AD. She is commemorated on 5 January in the Eastern Orthodox Church, Eastern Catholic Churches, and the Roman Catholic Church.

Elements from the pseudo-Athanasian Vita S. Syncleticæ were combined with details from the Apophthegmata Patrum and traditions associated with Theodora of Alexandria to form the narrative of Apollinaris Syncletica. Syncletica's name was removed from the Roman calendar of saints in 2001.

Syncletica is honored with a Lesser Feast (with Sarah, and Theodora) on the liturgical calendar of the Episcopal Church in the United States of America on January 5.

See also
 Sarah of the Desert
 Theoctiste of Lesbos
 Mary of Egypt

References

External links
 Antiochian Orthodox Church
 Monachos Library

270s births
350s deaths
4th-century Roman women
4th-century Christian saints
Hermits
Christian monasticism
Late Ancient Christian female saints
Anglican saints